The 1971 Ibrox disaster was a crush among the crowd at an Old Firm football game (Rangers v Celtic), which led to 66 deaths and more than 200 injuries.  It happened on 2 January 1971 in an exit stairway at Ibrox Park (now Ibrox Stadium) in Glasgow, Scotland. It was the worst British football disaster until the Bradford City stadium fire in Bradford, England, in 1985. This was followed by 97 deaths in the Hillsborough disaster in Sheffield, England, in 1989.

The stadium's owner, Rangers F.C., was later ruled to be at fault in a sheriff's judgement on one of the deaths. Rangers did not dispute this ruling, and was sued for damages in 60 other cases brought by relatives of the dead.

Background
The first disaster at Ibrox occurred during a 1902 home international match between Scotland and England.  The back of the wooden West Tribune Stand collapsed due to heavy rainfall the previous night, causing 25 deaths and more than 500 injuries.

During 1963, concerns were raised about the safety of the stairway adjacent to passageway 13, colloquially known as Stairway 13, the exit closest to Copland Road subway station.  It was documented that the stairs provided very little freedom of movement due to crowd pressure; many were lifted off their feet by the crowd and had no choice in which lane they were going to use, or at what pace.

On 16 September 1961, two people were killed in a crush on the stairway.  In 1967, eight spectators were injured when leaving the stadium.  In 1969, 26 were injured in an accident on Stairway 13 during egress. No measures were taken to consult a professional firm to discuss the potential dangers from crowds on Stairway 13 following these events.  Subsequent to the 1961 accident, Rangers had by then spent a total of £150,000 on improvements to Ibrox, a very significant sum of money for the time.

Events
The disaster occurred on Saturday, 2 January 1971, when 66 people were killed in a crush as supporters tried to leave the stadium.  The match was an Old Firm game (Rangers v Celtic) and was attended by more than 80,000 fans.  In the 90th minute, Celtic took a 1–0 lead through Jimmy Johnstone, but in the final moments of the match, Colin Stein scored an equaliser for Rangers.  As thousands of spectators were leaving the ground by stairway 13, it appears that someone may have fallen, causing a massive chain-reaction pile-up of people.

Initially there was speculation that some fans left the ground slightly early when Celtic scored, but then turned back when they heard the crowd cheering when Stein scored the equaliser, colliding with fans leaving the ground when the match ended.  The official inquiry into the disaster indicated that there was no truth in this hypothesis, however, as all the spectators were heading in the same direction at the time of the collapse.

More than 200 other fans were injured.

Kenny Dalglish, then a Celtic player, was in the stands when the tragedy occurred.  Dalglish was also present at the Heysel and Hillsborough disasters, in 1985 and 1989 respectively, with Liverpool F.C.

Victims
Sixty-six people died on the day at the stadium as a result of injuries incurred during the disaster. Of those who died, all were aged under 50, 61 were under 40, 49 were under 30, 33 were under 20 and 1 was aged under 10. The loss included many children, five of whom, Peter Easton, Martin Paton, Mason Phillips, Brian Todd and Douglas Morrison, were schoolmates from the same town of Markinch in Fife.  The loss also included 31 teenagers, including the only female victim Margaret Ferguson of Maddiston in Falkirk, age 18.  The youngest child to die was Nigel Patrick Pickup of Liverpool, age 9.

Over 200 people were reported to have suffered injuries.

Aftermath

The disaster spurred the UK government to look into safety at sports grounds.  In February 1971, Scottish judge Lord Wheatley was asked to conduct an inquiry.  His findings, published in May 1972, formed the basis for the Guide to Safety at Sports Grounds (Green Guide), first published in 1973.

The 1971 disaster led to a huge redevelopment of the Ibrox ground, spearheaded by the then-manager Willie Waddell, who visited Borussia Dortmund's Westfalenstadion for inspiration.  After three years' reconstruction work, three-quarters of the ground being replaced by modern all-seater stands, Ibrox was converted to a 44,000-capacity stadium by 1981. Further work in the 1990s increased the stadium capacity to 50,000, and Ibrox was subsequently awarded UEFA five-star status.

The Scottish folk singer-songwriter Matt McGinn (1928–1977) wrote a song called "The Ibrox Disaster" as a tribute to the people who died in the tragic event.

Investigation 
A fatal accident inquiry had been held in Glasgow which opened on 15 February 1971.  It lasted 7 days, although the jury of four men and three women had been instructed not to make recommendations around safety precautions at football grounds, because an inquiry led by Lord Wheatley would be examining this.

Litigation
Sheriff James Irvine Smith, in his statement after a civil damages trial raised at Glasgow Sheriff Court in May 1974 by the widow of one of the Ibrox victims, ruled: "The said accident was due to the fault and negligence of the defenders, Rangers F.C.". Smith found Rangers F.C. guilty on four counts in the case of the death of Charles Dougan, a 31-year-old boilermaker from Clydebank who died, as did 56 others, from traumatic asphyxia.

After hearing of the series of accidents on Stairway 13 including September 1961 when there were 70 people injured and two deaths, September 1967 when 11 people were taken to hospital, and January 1969 when 29 people were injured, Sheriff Irvine Smith stated,

In the case of Charles Dougan and a further 60 cases brought by relatives of the dead, Rangers F.C. did not dispute the findings of Sheriff Irvine Smith and instead merely disputed the calculation of the damages as can be seen from the appeal judgement of the Sheriff Principal. In his book, Irvine Smith states that almost 40 years after his decision, he was viewed with disapproval by some Rangers-supporting friends, who accused him of "disloyalty".

Legacy 
For some years after the 1971 disaster, there was only a small plaque at the corner of the ground where it happened.  However, in 1995, Rangers announced plans to commemorate the 66 fans killed in the 1971 disaster.  On 2 January 2001, the 30th anniversary of the tragedy, a larger monument was unveiled at the corner of the Bill Struth Main Stand and the Copland Road Stand.  The monument contains blue plaques displaying the names of each person killed in all three incidents. A statue of John Greig, the Rangers captain at the time of the 1971 disaster, stands atop the monument.

In 2011, the 40th anniversary of the disaster was commemorated before the Old Firm game on 2 January 2011 when a one-minute silence was observed before the game.  Both teams wore black armbands as a sign of respect and were led out by John Greig and Billy McNeill – the respective club captains at the time of the disaster (although Billy McNeill had not played due to injury).

See also
1902 Ibrox disaster
Burnden Park disaster
Luzhniki disaster – in Moscow on 20 October 1982
Bradford City stadium fire
Hillsborough disaster
List of disasters of the United Kingdom and preceding states
Heysel Stadium disaster

References

External links
Stairway 13 – The Ibrox disaster, 2001 BBC Scotland documentary
Names of casualties and their ages
The five boys who didn’t come home: The story of the 1971 Ibrox Disaster

Disasters in Glasgow
1971 disasters in the United Kingdom
1970s in Glasgow
Stadium disasters
History of football in Scotland
1970–71 in Scottish football
Human stampedes in the United Kingdom
Fatal accident inquiries
Old Firm matches
Govan

de:Ibrox-Katastrophe
es:Desastres de Ibrox
it:Disastro dell'Ibrox
ja:アイブロックスの惨事